Frank Primmer (born 16 January 1933) is a former  Australian rules footballer who played with South Melbourne in the Victorian Football League (VFL).

Notes

External links 

Living people
1933 births
Australian rules footballers from Victoria (Australia)
Sydney Swans players
South Warrnambool Football Club players